Merriwa River, a perennial river of the Hunter River catchment, is located in the Upper Hunter region of New South Wales, Australia.

Course and features
Merriwa River rises on the southern slopes of the Great Dividing Range, below Oxleys Peak, north of Merriwa and flows generally south, joined by eight minor tributaries before reaching its confluence with the Goulburn River below Mount Kerrabee. The river descends  over its  course.

At the town of Merriwa, the Golden Highway crosses the Merriwa River.

Merriwa is thought to be derived from the Aboriginal word meaning "grass seeds."

See also

 Rivers of New South Wales
 List of rivers of New South Wales (L–Z)
 List of rivers of Australia
 Goulburn River National Park

References

External links
 
 Merriwa online community website

 

Rivers of New South Wales
Rivers of the Hunter Region
Upper Hunter Shire